

Order: Anguilliformes

Anguillidae (Freshwater eels) 
Indian mottled eel Anguilla bengalensis bengalensis

Order: Cypriniformes

Balitoridae (River loaches) 
 Mottled loach Acanthocobitis botia
 Gray's stone loach or Rock carp (Balitora brucei) - (native)
 Nemacheilus multifasciatus - (native)
 Creek loach (Schistura beavani) - (native) 
 Schistura corica - (native)
 Stone loach (Schistura rupecula) - (native)
 Schistura savona - (native)
 Schistura scaturigina - (native)
 Balitora eddsi - (endemic)

Cobitidae (Loaches) 
 Almorha loach (Botia almorhae) - (native)
 Reticulate loach (Botia lohachata) - (native)
 Guntea loach (Lepidocephalichthys guntea) - (native)
 Gongota loach (Somileptus gongota) - (native)

Cyprinidae 
 Mola carplet (Amblypharyngodon mola)
 Bighead carp (Aristichthys nobilis) - (not established)
 Jaya or Mara (Aspidoparia jaya) - (native)
 Aspidoparia morar - (native)
 Barred baril (Barilius barila) - (native) 
 Barna baril (Barilius barna) - (native)
 Hamilton's barila (Barilius bendelisis) - (native) 
 Shacra baril (Barilius shacra) - (native)
 Tileo baril (Barilius tileo) - (native)
 Lam faketa or Dudhnea (Barilius vagra) - (native) 
 Crucian carp (Carassius carassius) - (introduced)
 Bhakur or Catla (Catla catla) - (native) 
 Chaguni (Chagunius chagunio) - (native)
 Silver hatchet chela (Chela cachius) - (native) 
 Gangetic latia (Crossocheilus latius) - (native) 
 Grass carp (Ctenopharyngodon idella) - (not established)
 Assamese kingfish (Cyprinion semiplotum) - (native) 
 Common carp (Cyprinus carpio carpio) - (introduced)
 Nepalese Snowtrout (Schizothorax macrophthalmus) - (endemic)
 Moustached danio (Danio dangila) - (native)
 Zebra danio (Danio rerio) - (native)
 Giant danio (Devario aequipinnatus) - (native) 
 Devario danio, Sind danio (Devario devario) - (native) 
 Tibetan snowtrout, Scaly Osman (Diptychus maculatus) - (native) 
 Indian flying barb (Esomus danricus) - (native) 
 Annandale garra (Garra annandalei) - (native) 
 Sucker head (Garra gotyla gotyla) - (native) 
 Gadhera (Garra lamta) - (native) 
 Mullya garra (Garra mullya) - (native) 
 Silver carp (Hypophthalmichthys molitrix) (not established) 
 Angra labeo (Labeo angra) - (native) 
 Reba (Labeo ariza) - (native) 
 Bata (Labeo bata) - (introduced)

Order: Siluriformes

Bagridae 
 Batasio macronotus - (endemic)

References
 
 
 
 

Nepal
Fish
Fish